Typhina grandis is a species of sea snail, a marine gastropod mollusk in the family Muricidae, the murex snails or rock snails.

Description

Distribution

References

 Houart, R, Buge, B. & Zuccon, D. (2021). A taxonomic update of the Typhinae (Gastropoda: Muricidae) with a review of New Caledonia species and the description of new species from New Caledonia, the South China Sea and Western Australia. Journal of Conchology. 44(2): 103–147.

External links
 Adams, A. (1855). Descriptions of a new genus and of several new species of gasteropodous Mollusca, from the Cumingian collection. Proceedings of the Zoological Society of London. (1854) 22: 41–42

grandis
Gastropods described in 1855